Baeoglossa is a genus of beetles in the family Carabidae, containing the following species:

 Baeoglossa melanaria (Boheman, 1846)
 Baeoglossa villosa (Thunberg, 1806)

References

Anthiinae (beetle)